Shahr Jadid-e Alvi (also Romanized as Shahr Jadīd-e ʿAlvī) is a village in Kohurestan Rural District, in the Central District of Khamir County, Hormozgan Province, Iran. At the 2006 census, its population was 189, in 41 families.

References 

Populated places in Khamir County